Beijing Urban Construction Group (BUCG) is a Chinese construction contractor. Several of the most recognizable buildings in Beijing including venues of the 2008 Summer Olympics were built by the company. The company has also carried out several projects in Belarus and Bangladesh.

Subsidiaries
One of BUCG's subsidiaries, Yunnan Jingjian Rail Transit, is the operator of Kunming Metro Line 4.

Belarus
The company was chosen as the general contractor to build a football stadium in June 2020. In the same announcement, BUCG's Beijing competitor Beijing Construction Engineering Group was named as the general contractor for a swimming pool meeting international standards.

Bangladesh
In April 2020, the company signed a deal with Civil Aviation Authority of Bangladesh to construct a new terminal building at Osmani International Airport in Sylhet.

References

Real estate companies of China
Government-owned companies of China